Romuald Jankowski (19 February 1934 – 12 February 1994) was a Polish politician from the Polish People's Party. He served as member of the Senate from 14 October 1993 until almost one month after his death, 10 March 1994.

References

1934 births
1994 deaths
People from Lutsk
People from Wołyń Voivodeship (1921–1939)
Polish People's Party politicians
Members of the Senate of Poland 1993–1997